Amico mio (English: My Friend) is a 1993 Italian-German television series set in a children's hospital and stars Massimo Dapporto. The series, which focuses on the stories of Dr. Magri (Dapporto) and his colleagues in the department of pediatrics of San Carlo di Nancy hospital in Rome, aired for two seasons on Rai 2 and then Canale 5, as well as on Das Erste in Germany.

Cast

Massimo Dapporto: Dr. Paolo Magri
Katharina Böhm: Dr. Angela Mancinelli (season 1)
Desirée Nosbusch: Dr. Angela Mancinelli (season 2)
Claudia Pandolfi: Susanna Calabrò (season 1)
Karin Proia: Susanna Calabrò (season 2)
Maria Amelia Monti: Clara 
Lisa Kreuzer: Angela's Mother
Ugo Pagliai: Filippo Antognazzi
Riccardo Garrone: Primario
Pierfrancesco Favino: Beppe Vanni
Cristiana Capotondi: Helene 
Adriano Pantaleo: Spillo
Piero Natoli: Tony Greco 
Antonella Attili: Marinella

See also
List of Italian television series

External links
 

Italian television series
RAI original programming

1993 Italian television series debuts